Saša Bakarić (born 18 March 1987) is a Slovenian footballer who plays for Austrian club SC Kappel.

External links
NZS profile 

1987 births
Living people
Sportspeople from Celje
Slovenian footballers
Association football midfielders
Association football fullbacks
NK Celje players
NK Zagorje players
NK Rudar Velenje players
Slovenian PrvaLiga players
Slovenian Second League players
Slovenian expatriate footballers
Expatriate footballers in Austria
Slovenian expatriate sportspeople in Austria
Slovenia youth international footballers
Slovenia under-21 international footballers